

MagoII, also known as Magon, was Shofet of Carthage from 396 to 375 BCE, and was a member of the Magonid dynasty. He became Shofet after the suicide of Himilco II in 396 BCE and was succeeded by Mago III (or Himilco Mago) in 375 BCE.

His reign started during wars with the Greeks of Sicily, who under the leadership of Dionysius I of Syracuse had defeated his predecessor. He quelled a rebellion in Libya, and made peace with Syracuse at the expense of his Sicilian allies the Sicels.

War broke out again at the end of his reign and he died in the Carthaginian defeat of the Battle of Cabala, he was succeeded by his son, also called Mago "Himilco Mago" who led the Carthaginians to a great victory against Dionysius at the battle of Cronium.

See also
 Magonids

References

Citations

Bibliography
 .  

Magonids
Monarchs of Carthage
4th-century BC rulers
4th-century BC Punic people